Sweetwater Creek is a stream in the U.S. state of Georgia. It is a tributary to the Flint River.

According to tradition, Sweetwater Creek received its name when a quantity of cane syrup accidentally was spilled into its waters.

References

Rivers of Georgia (U.S. state)
Rivers of Macon County, Georgia
Rivers of Schley County, Georgia
Rivers of Sumter County, Georgia